Maulkuppe is a mountain of Hesse, Germany.

Mountains of Hesse
Mountains and hills of the Rhön